Jerome Austin Browne (born February 13, 1966), nicknamed "The Governor", is an American former second baseman who played ten seasons in Major League Baseball (MLB). He also worked as a hitting coach for the Syracuse Chiefs.

Browne's best season was 1989, when he batted .299 for the Cleveland Indians with 31 doubles and 14 stolen bases.

References

External links

1966 births
Living people
Major League Baseball second basemen
Texas Rangers players
Cleveland Indians players
Oakland Athletics players
Florida Marlins players
Oklahoma City 89ers players
Burlington Rangers players
Salem Redbirds players
Tulsa Drillers players
Tacoma Tigers players
Gulf Coast Rangers players
Major League Baseball players from the United States Virgin Islands
People from Saint Croix, U.S. Virgin Islands
African-American baseball players
Syracuse Chiefs coaches
Brevard County Manatees players
21st-century African-American people
20th-century African-American sportspeople